The Book of Eggs: A Life-Size Guide to the Eggs of Six Hundred of the World's Bird Species is a book detailing the eggs of approximately 600 birds authored by Mark Hauber. It has received positive reviews, although it has been criticized for having a North American bias.

References

Oology